Guilherme Oliveira Santos (born 5 February 1988 in Jequié) is a Brazilian footballer who 
plays for Tombense as a left back.

References

External links

1988 births
Living people
Brazilian footballers
Brazilian expatriate footballers
CR Vasco da Gama players
UD Almería players
Expatriate footballers in Spain
Clube Atlético Mineiro players
Figueirense FC players
Santos FC players
Atlético Clube Goianiense players
Esporte Clube Bahia players
Fluminense FC players
Avaí FC players
Criciúma Esporte Clube players
Sampaio Corrêa Futebol Clube players
Anorthosis Famagusta F.C. players
Paysandu Sport Club players
Tombense Futebol Clube players
Júbilo Iwata players
Paraná Clube players
Botafogo de Futebol e Regatas players
Esporte Clube Juventude players
Associação Atlética Ponte Preta players
Campeonato Brasileiro Série A players
Campeonato Brasileiro Série B players
Cypriot First Division players
J1 League players
Expatriate footballers in Cyprus
Brazilian expatriate sportspeople in Cyprus
People from Jequié
Association football defenders
Sportspeople from Bahia